Call on Me is the third studio album by American R&B singer Evelyn "Champagne" King, released on September 8, 1980 by RCA Records. It was produced by Theodore Life and George Tindley. 

The album peaked at No. 58 on the R&B albums chart. It also reached No. 124 on the Billboard 200. It produced the single "Let's Get Funky Tonight".

Track listing

Credits
Strings and horns – George Andrews
Art direction – J.J. Stelmach

Charts

References

External links

Evelyn "Champagne" King albums
1980 albums
RCA Records albums